George Jones, also titled George Jones (We Can Make It) was the 1972 country music studio album released by George Jones in April 1972. The release was Jones' 46th studio album release since a debut from 16 years previous. Also as a highlight in his career, it was the first release made on Jones' new label, Epic Records.

The album charted very well for a George Jones album, eventually rising to #10 on the country charts. The album included some other artist's hits from 1971, including Charley Pride's "Kiss an Angel Good Morning" and former Jones Boys bass player, Johnny Paycheck's "She's All I Got". Its title track "We Can Make It" peaked out at #6 on the US Country chart.

Background
For years, Jones had been staying back while his long-time manager and producer, Pappy Daily, made deal after deal with label after label. After taking him to Mercury (1957–1962) Daily signed Jones to United Artists (1962–1964) where he saw his biggest success during the 1960s. After leaving UA in early '64, he signed with Musicor Records (1964–1971), and saw a dropoff of his sound quality and sales. However, his biggest success was yet to come, and it would start with his third wife, Tammy Wynette. The two often crossed paths during tours, and Jones proclaimed his love for her in 1969, and the two later married. It was through their inseparable relationship that Jones met Wynette's producer, Billy Sherrill. Soon, the two began recording, and he even became Jones's producer full-time, having him sign with Epic Records (1972–1991). Soon after signing, Sherrill began producing the album's track recordings.

Recording and composition

Recording
George Jones recorded in a session in November 1971, which wrapped up 8 songs, all of which were included: "I'll Take You My World", "Kiss An Angel Good Morning", "All the Praises", "She's All I Got", "The Last Letter", "The King", "Try It, You'll Like It", and the final cut, "Let's Make History". His very next session was recorded on January 12, 1972, where he recorded "We Can Make It" and "One of These Days". The final recording was made during a session on February 10, which cut "Loving You Could Never Be Better". All the tracks were recorded at the Columbia Recording Studio; 804 16th Ave. South, in Nashville, Tennessee.

Composition

Side one tracks
Most of the tracks are previous hits, and nearly all the songs listed were written by different songwriters: "We Can Make It" was written by the album's producer Billy Sherrill alongside Glenn Sutton. The song is the best efforts by Jones of his early years with Epic. It was released in February 1972 and peaked at #6 on the US Country chart. The two also wrote the next song on the album, "I'll Take You to My World". "Kiss An Angel Good Morning" was a #1 hit with Charley Pride in 1971, and written by Ben Peters. "All the Praises" was written by J. Strickland and was later recorded by Connie Smith for one of her LP releases in 1973. During the mid to the late-1960s, Jones toured and recorded with Johnny Paycheck as a key member in his Jones Boys Band, often singing backup in studio sessions and live performances. After leaving the Boys in 1969, he went to pursue his own career, which basically launched with his first Top 10 chart since 1966. "She's All I Got" peaked at #2 after being written by Gary Bonds and Jerry Williams.

Side two tracks
"The Last Letter" was written by Rex Griffin. The next track listed is "Loving You Could Never Be Better", which displays Jones's love for his new wife, Tammy. The song was written by Betty Belew with C. and Earl Montgomery. "The King" was written by Roger D. Ferris in 1970. The next upbeat listing was "Try It, You'll Like It", which was written by Jimmy Peppers and later included as the b-side track to "We Can Make It". Track 10 was "One Of These Days" written by Earl Montgomery, and the last track "Let's Make History" was written by J. Strickland.

Track listing

Reception
The back of the original LP album cover contains an intro to Jones by his wife:

AllMusic's Chris Woodstra writes:

The album went somewhat unnoticed by country listeners. The album charted at #10 (US Country).

External links
 George Jones' Official Website
 Record Label

1972 albums
George Jones albums
Albums produced by Billy Sherrill
Epic Records albums